Baloghia is a genus of plants under the family Euphorbiaceae first described as a genus in 1833. It is native to Australia (Queensland, New South Wales, Lord Howe I., Norfolk Island), New Caledonia, and Vanuatu. Cocconerion is a close relative.

Species

Formerly included
moved to Austrobuxus Fontainea Scagea 
 B. carunculata - Austrobuxus carunculatus
 B. oligostemon - Scagea oligostemon
 B. pancheri - Fontainea pancheri

References

Codiaeae
Euphorbiaceae genera